Ransom Halloway (c. 1793 – April 6, 1851) was a United States representative from New York.

Early life
Halloway was born in Pawling, Dutchess County. His name is sometimes spelled "Holloway."   After the deaths of their parents, Ransom and his sister were raised by relatives.

Career
He settled in Beekman, where he farmed and worked as a hat maker.  He was also active in the state militia, and was appointed paymaster of the 30th Brigade in 1818.

Halloway was elected as a Whig to the Thirty-first Congress, holding office from March 4, 1849 to March 3, 1851.

Personal life
In 1820, he married Rebecca Dodge, a daughter of Joseph and Ann Dodge, who died on August 5, 1843.

In 1851, a few months before his death, he married Eliza Genevieve Waring of Mount Pleasant in Prince George County, Maryland.  His second wife's name appears in some accounts as "Warren."

He died on April 6, 1851 in Upper Marlboro, Maryland at Mount Pleasant, the home of his second wife. He was buried next to his first wife at the Dodge Family Cemetery in Pawling.

References

External links

Ransom Halloway at Find A Grave

1793 births
1851 deaths
People from Beekman, New York
Paymasters
Whig Party members of the United States House of Representatives from New York (state)
19th-century American politicians
People from Pawling, New York